Kosma Tadeusz Złotowski (born 14 January 1964 in Bydgoszcz, Poland) is a Polish politician who was a member of both chambers of the Polish parliament (1997-2001, 2005-2007), President (=Mayor) of Bydgoszcz (1994-1995) and a member of Bydgoszcz City Council (2002-2005).

, graduated in Polish philology from University of Warsaw. In 2004, obtained the degree of Master of Business Administration (MBA) at Dominican University in Chicago.

After 1994 local election new Bydgoszcz City Council elected him as President (=Mayor) of Bydgoszcz. He served his office between July 1994 and July 1995 and was replaced by Henryk Sapalski.

In 1997 Sejm election he joined the Senate of Poland III term (upper house of the Polish parliament) representing the Bydgoszcz district as Solidarity Electoral Action candidate.

In 2002 Polish local election he joined the Bydgoszcz City Council IV term representing the 1st district. He polled 1,112 votes and was first on the Law and Justice (PiS) list. His term was ended when he was elected to Sejm in 2005. His seat in the Council was replaced by the second candidate on the PiS list Marian Pastuszewski. He ran in the 2002 Bydgoszcz presidencial election. He scored 8,994 votes (10.99%) and was third in race. The new president was elected in the second ballot.

In 2004 European Parliament election he was a candidate of Law and Justice from Kuyavian-Pomeranian constituency. He polled 4,264 votes and was not elected.

In 2005 Senate election he joined the Senate of Poland IV term (upper house of the Polish parliament) representing the 4 Bydgoszcz district. He polled 59,986 votes. In 2007 Senate election he scored 86,750 and was not elected.

See also 
 Bydgoszcz

References

External links 
 (pl) Złotowski at Senate webside

Members of the Senate of Poland 1997–2001
Members of Bydgoszcz City Council
1964 births
Living people
MEPs for Poland 2014–2019
MEPs for Poland 2019–2024